Generations of Change is a 2004 album by Ed Miller.

Track listing
 Ferry Me Over (Andy M. Stewart) - 3:45
 Yellow on the Broom (Adam McNaughtan) - 3:34
 The Broom of the Cowdenknowes (traditional) - 3:28
 A Bottle of the Best (Jack Foley) - 2:51
 Generations of Change (Matt Armour)- 4:26
 The Banks of Sicily (Hamish Henderson) - 4:30
 Green Grow the Rashes O (Robert Burns) - 4:13
 Crooked Jack (Dominic Behan) - 4:20
 A Man's a Man (Robert Burns) - 3:50
 Edinburgh Toon (Ken Thomson)- 2:02
 Tak a Dram (Ian Sinclair) - 2:48
 At Home with the Exiles (Ed Miller) - 3:55
 Blood upon the Grass (Adam McNaughtan/Ed Miller) - 2:57
 Mistress (Nancy Nicolson) - 3:20
 The John MacLean March (Hamish Henderson) - 3:48

2004 albums
Ed Miller (Scottish folk musician) albums